Gessica is the Italian and Portuguese equivalent of the English Jessica. Notable people with the name include:
Géssica do Nascimento (born 1991), Brazilian footballer
Gessica Morlacchi (born 1987), a member of the Italian band Gazosa
Gessica Rostellato (born 1982), Italian politician
Gessica Turato (born 1984), Italian road cyclist

Italian feminine given names
Portuguese feminine given names